The Bernard 82 was a French single-engined long-range monoplane bomber designed and built by Société des Avions Bernard. Only two prototypes were built and the type did not enter production.

Design and development
The Bernard 82 was developed from the long-range Bernard 80 GR, which had been designed to set long-distance-flight records. The all-metal Bernard 82 was a three-seat long-range bomber, known at the time as a bombardier de représailles or reprisal bomber. The cantilever mid-wing monoplane was powered by an  Hispano-Suiza 12Ybrs inline piston engine. The first prototype flew from Le Bourget on 11 December 1933, and in March 1932 was joined by the second prototype. Flight testing showed the twin lateral radiators to be inadequate; they were replaced by front-mounted radiators. Landing-gear deficiencies were the most persistent difficulty encountered during testing. The retractable landing gear regularly failed; resulting in wheels-up landings. The problem was never resolved, and testing was halted in mid-1935; the production contract for ten aircraft was cancelled.

In August 1936 the second prototype was re-engined with a  CLM Lille 6As, a licence-built Jumo 205 diesel engine. The diesel-powered aircraft, redesignated Bernard 86,  was entered into the 1936 Paris-Saigon-Paris air race. The race was run in September, but the Bernard was not ready by then, so it was not used. There were no further flight tests; the units were scrapped.

Specifications

See also

References

Notes

Bibliography

082
1930s French bomber aircraft
Single-engined tractor aircraft
Mid-wing aircraft
Aircraft first flown in 1933